Hugh Despenser may refer to:

 Hugh le Despenser (sheriff) (died 1238), High Sheriff of Berkshire
 Hugh Despenser (justiciar) (1223–1265), son of the above
 Hugh Despenser the Elder (1261–1326), son of the above
 Hugh Despenser the Younger (died 1326), son of the above
 Hugh le Despenser, Baron le Despenser (1338) (1308–1349), son of the above
Hugh Despenser (died 1374) (1339–1374), second son of Edward Despenser, son of the above

See also
 Despenser